Menier may refer to:

Places:
Port-Menier, Quebec, a small fishing town located in Anticosti Island, Quebec, Canada
Port-Menier Airport, (IATA: YPN, ICAO: CYPN), located 2.7 NM (5.0 km; 3.1 mi) east of Port-Menier, Quebec, Canada

Chocolate:
 Menier Chocolate, a French chocolate manufacturing business founded in 1816
Menier family of Noisiel, France, was a prominent family of chocolatiers who began as pharmaceutical manufacturers in Paris in 1816
Émile-Justin Menier (1826–1881), French pharmaceutical manufacturer, chocolatier, and politician, born in Paris
Antoine Brutus Menier (1795–1853), a French entrepreneur and founder of the Menier family of chocolatiers
Antoine Gilles Menier (1904–1967), a French businessman and municipal politician, member of the Menier family of chocolatiers
Henri Menier (1853–1913), a French businessman and adventurer, member of the Menier family of chocolatiers
Menier Chocolate Factory, a 180-seat fringe studio theatre, restaurant and gallery in a former 1870s Menier Chocolate Company factory in Southwark, London

See also
 Meunier
 Minier
 Munier
 Mounier